Lakmal is a Sinhalese name that may refer to the following people:
 
Surname
Chaturanga Lakmal (born 1988), Sri Lankan weightlifter
Dulanga Lakmal (born 1991), Sri Lankan cricketer
Lahiru Sri Lakmal (born 1989), Sri Lankan cricketer
Ravindra Lakmal (born 1981), Sri Lankan cricketer
Suranga Lakmal (born 1987), Sri Lankan cricketer
 
Forename
Hasitha Lakmal de Silva (born 1991), Sri Lankan cricketer
Sampath Lakmal de Silva (1988–2006), Sri Lankan journalist
Lakmal Fernando (born 1980), Sri Lankan cricketer
Lakmal Kasturiarachchige (born 1986), Sri Lanka born Austrian cricketer
Lakmal Perera (born 1986), Ghanaian cricketer

See also

Sinhalese surnames
Sinhalese masculine given names